Elections to Maldon District Council were held on 5 May 2011 as part of the wider elections across the United Kingdom. The Conservative Party remained in control of the council, winning 28 of the 31 seats.

Results

2011
2011 English local elections